The 1955–56 NCAA men's ice hockey season began in November 1955 and concluded with the 1956 NCAA Men's Ice Hockey Tournament's championship game on March 17, 1956 at the Broadmoor Ice Palace in Colorado Springs, Colorado. This was the 9th season in which an NCAA ice hockey championship was held and is the 62nd year overall where an NCAA school fielded a team.

Clarkson completed the first undefeated season, going 23-0, since the inception of the NCAA tournament. As of 2016 only Cornell (in 1970) has been able to accomplish the same feat.

Regular season

Season tournaments

Standings

1956 NCAA Tournament

Note: * denotes overtime period(s)

Player stats

Scoring leaders
The following players led the league in points at the conclusion of the season.

GP = Games played; G = Goals; A = Assists; Pts = Points; PIM = Penalty minutes

Leading goaltenders
The following goaltenders led the league in goals against average at the end of the regular season while playing at least 33% of their team's total minutes.

GP = Games played; Min = Minutes played; W = Wins; L = Losses; OT = Overtime/shootout losses; GA = Goals against; SO = Shutouts; SV% = Save percentage; GAA = Goals against average

Awards

NCAA

WIHL
No Awards

References

External links
College Hockey Historical Archives
1955–56 NCAA Standings

 
NCAA